Events from the year 2001 in Nepal.

Incumbents
Monarch: King Birendra (until June 1), King Dipendra (from June 1 to June 4), King Gyanendra (from June 4)
Prime Minister: Girija Prasad Koirala (until 26 July), Sher Bahadur Deuba (from 26 July)
Chief Justice: Keshav Prasad Upadhyaya

Events
 January - 10th General Convention of Nepali Congress.
 June 1 - Nepalese royal massacre.
 June 4 - Prince Gyanendra is crowned King.
 November 23 - Maoists attack a Royal Nepal Army base for the first time in Ghorahi, Dang.
 November 26 - The government declares a national state of emergency.

Deaths
 February 5 - Daya Bir Singh Kansakar, social worker
 April 29 - Babu Chiri Sherpa, mountaineer
 June 1 - King Birendra
 June 1 - Queen Aishwarya
 June 1 - Princess Shruti
 June 1 - Prince Nirajan
 June 4 - King Dipendra
 November 12 - Princess Prekshya

References

 
Nepal
Years of the 21st century in Nepal
2000s in Nepal
Nepal